The Turner Brook Reserve is a nature preserve located in Forestburgh, New York, United States. Its western boundary runs along the Cold Spring Road in Forestburgh and its easternmost point is High Falls in The Neversink Gorge. The reserve is named after Turner Brook, a stream that runs along the westernmost part of the reserve and flows into Gillman Pond.

History
The Turner Brook Reserve was established in 1968 by Ben Wechsler, who died on July 21, 2011.

References

Protected areas of Sullivan County, New York
Protected areas established in 1968
Nature reserves in New York (state)
1968 establishments in New York (state)